Convolvulus tricolor (syn. C. minor) is a species of flowering plant in the family Convolvulaceae, native to Mediterranean Europe. Common names include dwarf morning-glory, tricolour convolvulus, and belle de jour.

Description 
It is a short to medium annual plant with solitary long-stalked flowers. The flower is a tri-coloured funnel-shaped bloom about three centimeters wide, blue with white and a yellow centre.

Taxonomy

Synonyms 
 Convolvulus maroccanus  Batt.
 Convolvulus meonanthus Hoffmanns. & Link
 Convolvulus minor 
 Convolvulus pseudotricolor Bertol.

Subspecies 
 Convolvulus tricolor subsp. hortensis (Batt.) Maire
 Convolvulus tricolor subsp. meonanthus (Hoffmanns. & Link) Maire 
 Convolvulus tricolor subsp. pentapetaloides (L.) O.Bolòs & Vigo 
 Convolvulus tricolor subsp. tricolor L.

O. Bolòs et J. Vigoe distinguish Convolvulus tricolor ssp. pentapetaloides (L.) O.Bolòs & Vigo, found in the Balearic isles, from the type subspecies (Convolvulus tricolor ssp tricolor) by flowers that are smaller (7–10 mm), and both the calyx and the capsule having few or no hairs.

Habitat 
Common on cultivated land, dry open habitats, sandy places and roadsides. Soil must be warmed to at least 64 °F to grow without any issues.

Distribution 
This flowering plant is native to the Mediterranean Basin, particularly the south, but it is occasionally seen in other areas of similar climate. In Spain it can be found in the Balearic Islands,
and Andalusia, especially in the Costa del Sol.

Cultivation 
Convolvulus tricolor is usually cultivated for ornamental purposes. The species and the cultivar 'Blue Ensign' have both received the Royal Horticultural Society's Award of Garden Merit.

References

External links 

 CalFlora
 IPNI Listing

tricolor
Plants described in 1753
Taxa named by Carl Linnaeus
Flora of Malta